The Pawnee Pioneer Trails Scenic Byway is a  Colorado Scenic and Historic Byway located in Logan, Morgan, and Weld counties, Colorado, USA. the byway explores the Pawnee Buttes region and Pawnee National Grassland of northeastern Colorado.

Route

Gallery

See also

History Colorado
List of scenic byways in Colorado
Scenic byways in the United States

Notes

References

External links

America's Scenic Byways: Colorado
Colorado Department of Transportation
Colorado Scenic & Historic Byways Commission
Colorado Scenic & Historic Byways
Colorado Travel Map
Colorado Tourism Office
History Colorado

Colorado Scenic and Historic Byways

Tourist attractions in Colorado
Tourist attractions in Logan County, Colorado
Tourist attractions in Morgan County, Colorado
Tourist attractions in Weld County, Colorado
Interstate 76
U.S. Route 6
U.S. Route 34
U.S. Route 85
U.S. Route 138